Harry Hammond Hess (May 24, 1906 – August 25, 1969) was an American geologist and a United States Navy officer in World War II who is considered one of the "founding fathers" of the unifying theory of plate tectonics. He is best known for his theories on sea floor spreading, specifically work on relationships between island arcs, seafloor gravity anomalies, and serpentinized peridotite, suggesting that the convection of the Earth's mantle was the driving force behind this process.

Early life and education 
Harry Hammond Hess was born on May 24, 1906, in New York City to Julian S. Hess, a member of the New York Stock Exchange, and Elizabeth Engel Hess. He attended Asbury Park High School in Asbury Park, New Jersey. In 1923, he entered Yale University, where he intended to study electrical engineering but ended up graduating with a Bachelor of Science degree in geology. He spent two years as an exploration geologist in Northern Rhodesia. In 1934 he married Annette Burns.

Teaching career
Harry Hess taught for one year (1932–1933) at Rutgers University in New Jersey and spent a year as a research associate at the Geophysical Laboratory of Washington, D. C., before joining the faculty of Princeton University in 1934. Hess remained at Princeton for the rest of his career and served as Geology Department Chairman from 1950 to 1966. He was a visiting professor at the University of Cape Town, South Africa (1949–1950), and the University of Cambridge, England (1965).

The Navy-Princeton gravity expedition to the West Indies in 1932
Hess accompanied Dr. Felix Vening Meinesz of Utrecht University on board the US Navy submarine USS S-48 to assist with the second U.S. expedition to obtain gravity measurements at sea.  The expedition used a gravimeter, or gravity meter, designed by Meinesz.  The submarine traveled a route from Guantanamo, Cuba, to Key West, Florida, and return to Guantanamo through the Bahamas and Turks and Caicos region from 5 February through 25 March 1932. The description of operations and results of the expedition were published by the U.S. Navy Hydrographic Office in The Navy-Princeton gravity expedition to the West Indies in 1932.

Military and war career
Hess joined the United States Navy  during World War II, becoming captain of the USS Cape Johnson, an attack transport ship equipped with a new technology: sonar. This command would later prove to be key in Hess's development of his theory of sea floor spreading. Hess carefully tracked his travel routes to Pacific Ocean landings on the Marianas, Philippines, and Iwo Jima, continuously using his ship's echo sounder. This unplanned wartime scientific surveying enabled Hess to collect ocean floor profiles across the North Pacific Ocean, resulting in the discovery of flat-topped submarine volcanoes, which he termed guyots, after the 19th-century geographer Arnold Henry Guyot. After the war, he remained in the Naval Reserve, rising to the rank of rear admiral.

Scientific discoveries
In 1960, Hess made his single most important contribution, which is regarded as part of the major advance in geologic science of the 20th century. In a widely circulated report to the Office of Naval Research, he advanced the theory, now generally accepted, that the Earth's crust moved laterally away from long, volcanically active oceanic ridges. He only understood his ocean floor profiles across the North Pacific Ocean after Marie Tharp and Bruce Heezen (1953,   Lamont Group) discovered the Great Global Rift, running along the Mid-Atlantic Ridge.  Seafloor spreading, as the process was later named, helped establish Alfred Wegener's earlier (but generally dismissed at the time) concept of continental drift as scientifically respectable. This triggered a revolution in the earth sciences. Hess's report was formally published in his History of Ocean Basins (1962), which for a time was the single most referenced work in solid-earth geophysics. Hess was also involved in many other scientific endeavours, including the Mohole project (1957–1966), an investigation onto the feasibility and techniques of deep sea drilling.

Accolades and affiliations
Hess was elected to the United States National Academy of Sciences in 1952 and the American Philosophical Society in 1960. He was president of The Geological Society of America in 1963 and received their Penrose Medal in 1966. In 1968, he was elected to the American Academy of Arts and Sciences.

Death

Hess died from a heart attack in Woods Hole, Massachusetts, on August 25, 1969, while chairing a meeting of the Space Science Board of the National Academy of Sciences. He was buried at Arlington National Cemetery and was posthumously awarded the National Aeronautics and Space Administration's Distinguished Public Service Award.

The Harry H. Hess Medal

The American Geophysical Union established the Harry H. Hess medal in his memory in 1984 to "honor outstanding achievements in research of the constitution and evolution of Earth and sister planets."

Past recipients
Source:

 1985	Gerald J. Wasserburg
 1987	Julian R. Goldsmith
 1989	A.G.W. Cameron
 1991	George W. Wetherill
 1993	Alfred E. Ringwood
 1995	Edward Anders
 1996	Thomas J. Ahrens
 1997	Stanley Robert Hart
 1998	David J. Stevenson
 1999	Ikuo Kushiro
 2001	Albrecht Hofmann
 2002	Gerald Schubert
 2003	David L. Kohlstedt
 2004	Adolphe Nicolas
 2005	Sean C. Solomon
 2006	Alexandra Navrotsky
 2007	Michael John O'Hara
 2008	H. Jay Melosh
 2009	Frank M. Richter
 2010  David Walker
 2011  Henry Dick
 2012  Maria T. Zuber
 2013  Bernard Wood
 2014	Donald J. DePaolo
 2015	Claude Jaupart
 2016	Alexander Halliday
 2017 Roberta Rudnick
 2018 Timothy L. Grove
 2019 Richard J. Walker
 2020 Donald B. Dingwell

Selected publications
 
Also in:

 
 
 
 
 
Also in:

References

Further reading

External links
Harry Hess (1906–1969) A Science Odyssey: People and Discoveries
Harry Hammond Hess Biography taken from 
AGU Harry H. Hess Medal

American geophysicists
Asbury Park High School alumni
Tectonicists
Scientists from New York City
United States Navy rear admirals (upper half)
1906 births
1969 deaths
Academic staff of the University of Cape Town
Yale University alumni
Burials at Arlington National Cemetery
Penrose Medal winners
Princeton University faculty
Rutgers University faculty
Presidents of the Geological Society of America
Marine geophysicists
Members of the American Philosophical Society